This is a list of bays along the Atlantic coast of Maine, roughly in order from northeast to southwest, and divided by county.

Washington County
 Passamaquoddy Bay
 Cobscook Bay
 Dennys Bay
 East Bay
 Sipp Bay
 South Bay
 Straight Bay
 Whiting Bay
 Johnson Bay
 Little Machias Bay
 Machias Bay
 Holmes Bay
 Little Bay
 Little Kennebec Bay
 Englishman Bay
 Mason Bay
 Chandler Bay
 Eastern Bay
 Alley Bay
 Western Bay
 Wohoa Bay
 Pleasant Bay
 Narraguagus Bay
 Back Bay
 Flat Bay
 Harrington Bay
 Pigeon Hill Bay
 Dyer Bay
 Pinkham Bay
 Gouldsboro Bay
 Joy Bay
 West Bay

Hancock County
 Winter Harbor
 Frenchman Bay
 Eastern Bay
 Flanders Bay
 Taunton Bay
 Egypt Bay
 Hog Bay
 Thomas Bay
 Youngs Bay
 Eastern Way
 Somes Sound
 Western Way
 Western Bay
 Union River Bay
 Blue Hill Bay

Waldo County
 Penobscot Bay
 Belfast Bay
 Gilkey Harbor
 Seal Bay

Knox County
 Rockport Harbor
 Clam Cove
 Rockland Harbor
 Muscongus Bay

Lincoln County
 Johns Bay
 Linekin Bay
 Boothbay Harbor
 Booth Bay
 Sheepscot Bay
 Montsweag Bay
 Hockomock Bay

Sagadahoc County
 Merrymeeting Bay
 Sagadahoc Bay

Cumberland County
 Quahog Bay
 Harpswell Sound
 Middle Bay
 Maquoit Bay
 Casco Bay

York County
 Saco Bay

Also,
 Bay of Fundy
 Gulf of Maine

Maine
Bays